FC Sète 34 is the current name of a French football club based in Sète and founded in 1901 as Olympique de Cette. The club has won the French league title twice (in 1934 and 1939) and the French cup also twice (1930 and 1934). In 1934 they became the first club to win the French league and cup double. At the time, they were using the Georges-Bayrou Stadium. Until 1960, the club played a major role in the French football championship, but due to financial issues, it was forced to give up professional status. From the 1970s until 2005, the club played in secondary levels, before accessing Ligue 2 for one season after finishing at the 3rd rank of Championnat National.

The club currently plays in the Championnat National 2, the fourth tier of French football, and plays its games at Stade Louis Michel in the town.

History
The club was founded in 1901 as Olympique de Cette. It ceased activities due to the war in 1914, restarting as FC de Cette. The club was champion of the Ligue du Sud-Est for seven consecutive years from the inception of the competition in 1920 until 1926. In 1928 the name of the town changed from Cette to Sète, and the football club was renamed FC Sète. The club reached consecutive Coupe de France finals in 1929 and 1930, losing 2–0 to SO Montpellier in the first before winning the trophy against Racing Club de France 3–1 after extra time.

In 1932 the club were founder members of the professional Division 1. They finished 4th in the group. The following season they won the Division 1 and  double, becoming the first club to do so. They won their second Division 1 title in 1939, the last time the competition was played before World War II.

After the war, the club did not regain its previous heights, finishing no higher than 10th in Division 1, before relegation came in 1954. After six years in Division 2 the club relinquished its professional status and reformed as an amateur team at level two of the regional league (tier seven of the French league structure).

The club spent six years in the same regional division before securing three promotions in four years to return to national Division 2 for the 1970–71 season. A further six seasons followed before relegation to Division 3 in 1977. The club returned to Division 2 as champions of the south group of Division 3 in 1983 and spent six seasons at that level.

At the end of the 1988–89 season, FC Sète were administratively relegated for financial reasons after finishing 15th in group B. The club was officially renamed FC de Sète 34, restarted in Division 3, and moved to their current stadium Stade Louis Michel. They remained at the third level of French football until 1997 when a second administrative relegation dropped them to the fourth level, now named Championnat de France Amateur. After four seasons at this level, they won promotion back to Championnat National in 2001, as champions of group B. In 2005 a 3rd-place finish was enough for promotion to Ligue 2, but the club played just one season at this level before returning to the Championnat National at the end of the 2005–06 season.

A third administrative relegation, again for financial reasons, followed in 2009, and the club reformed for the 2009–10 season in the Division d'Honneur of the Languedoc-Roussillon regional league (tier 6). In 2012 they were promoted to Championnat de France Amateur 2 as champions of the Division d'Honneur and in 2014 they won promotion to Championnat de France Amateur, now called Championnat National 2. The club gained promotion to the Championnat National in the 2019–20 season, after being placed at the top of 2019–20 Championnat National 2 Group C when the season was terminated early due to the COVID-19 pandemic.

The club were relegated from the Championnat National by the Direction Nationale du Contrôle de Gestion at the end of the 2021–22 season, on the grounds of financial mismanagement.

Players

Current squad

Out on loan

Former players

Managerial history

Honours
Champion of France (highest level) : 1934, 1939
Winner of the French Cup : 1930, 1934
Finalist of Coupe de France : 1923, 1924, 1929, 1942
Champion of Division d'Honneur Sud-Est : 1920, 1921, 1922, 1923, 1924, 1925, 1926, 1968.
Champion of USFSA Languedoc : 1907, 1909, 1910, 1911, 1912, 1913, 1914.
Champion of Division d'Honneur Languedoc-Roussillon : 2012
Champion CFA2 Group G: 2014
Champion CFA Group B: 2001
Champion Division 3 South Group: 1983

References

External links
  

 
Association football clubs established in 1914
1914 establishments in France
Sport in Hérault
Football clubs in Occitania (administrative region)
Ligue 1 clubs